Pseudocolaspis rigida is a species of leaf beetle of Cameroon, the Democratic Republic of the Congo, Senegal, and Ivory Coast, described by Joseph Sugar Baly in 1877.

References

Eumolpinae
Beetles of Africa
Beetles of the Democratic Republic of the Congo
Insects of Cameroon
Insects of West Africa
Taxa named by Joseph Sugar Baly